Kiolbassa is an American sausage processing, packaging, and distribution company based in San Antonio, Texas. Kiolbassa is family-owned and has been in business since 1949.

History 
Rufus Kiolbassa founded the company in 1949 on San Antonio's West side. He died in 1960 at the age of 45, leaving the company to his wife and three children. His son, Robert, dropped out of college to run the company. Robert's son, Michael Kiolbassa joined the company in 1987 and later became the company president. During his tenure, Kiolbassa has become the highest grossing premium sausage manufacturer in Texas.

Products 
Kiolbassa specializes in beef sausages. It is made with whole-muscle meat and does not contain any offal meats, cereals, fillers, or chemicals.

Kiolbassa has a large market share throughout Texas and appears in 47/50 states as well as Mexico.

References

External links 
 

Food and drink companies based in San Antonio
Manufacturing companies based in San Antonio
Sausage companies of the United States
American companies established in 1949
1949 establishments in Texas